Górnik Łęczna is a Polish women's football club from Łęczna, Lublin Voivodeship, founded in 2002. It is a section of the wider Górnik Łęczna sports-club.

The women's section of Górnik Łęczna played for years in the second and third tier leagues of Poland. In 2006-07 the team reached the semi-finals of the Polish Cup but lost to Medyk Konin. In the 2009–10 season with the expansion of the Ekstraliga Kobiet the team finally gained promotion to it by finishing second in its 2nd tier division. In its Ekstraliga debut Górnik was 5th. They won the Polish Cup in 2018.

In the 2020–21 UEFA Women's Champions League season they reached the round of 32, defeated by Paris Saint-Germain.

Honours 
 Ekstraliga:
 Champions (3): 2017–18, 2018–19, 2019–20
 Polish Cup:
 Champions (2): 2017–18, 2019–20
 UEFA Women's Champions League:
 Round of 32 (1): 2020–21

European competitions

References

Górnik Łęczna
Women's football clubs in Poland
Association football clubs established in 2002
2002 establishments in Poland